These are the official results of the Men's 50 km Walk event at the 1993 World Championships held on Saturday August 21, 1993, in Stuttgart, Germany. There were a total number of 46 participating athletes.

Medalists

Abbreviations
All times shown are in hours:minutes:seconds

Intermediates

Final

See also
 1992 Men's Olympic 50km Walk (Barcelona)
 1996 Men's Olympic 50km Walk (Atlanta)

References
 Results
 Results - World Athletics

W
Racewalking at the World Athletics Championships